Stade rochelais basket is a French professional basketball team based in La Rochelle.  

The team plays in the LNB Pro B.

Players

Roster

Notable players
To appear in this section a player must have either:
- Set a club record or won an individual award as a professional player.
- Played at least one official international match for his senior national team at any time.
 Henry Pwono
 Kiady Razanamahenina

References

External links
French League profile
Eurobasket.com profile

Basketball teams established in 1932
Basketball teams in France
Stade Rochelais